Nattukku Oru Nallavan is a 1991 Tamil-language action film  written, produced and directed by V. Ravichandran and also produced by N. Veersamai. The film stars Rajinikanth, Juhi Chawla, V. Ravichandran, Anant Nag and Khushbu.

The film was simultaneously shot in Hindi as Shanti Kranti with a slightly different cast. The film marked the debut of popular Kannada actor Anant Nag in Tamil cinema as main antagonist. The music was composed by Hamsalekha.

The film was simultaneously released in Kannada and Telugu under the Shanti Kranti title in 1991. Nagarjuna was the lead in Telugu and Ravichandran was the lead in Kannada, while Rajinikanth was in the lead in Tamil and Hindi.
Incidentally, all the versions failed at the box-office.

Plot 

Nattukku Oru Nallavan is the story of an honest police officer and his fight against a dreaded criminal named Daddy who indulges in organ transplant mafia.

Cast

Production 
Sandalwood actor V. Ravichandran announced that Shanti Kranti will be an expensive project in his career. He decided to direct in four languages — Kannada, Tamil, Telugu and Hindi. The Tamil version was titled Naattukku Oru Nallavan. Rajinikanth played the lead in Hindi and Tamil, while Nagarjuna was in Telugu and Ravichandran himself in Kannada.

Release 
All the four versions of the film became a failure in box office.

Soundtrack 

Tamil version

Singers: S. P. Balasubrahmanyam, S. Janaki, K. S. ChithraLyrics: Vairamuthu, Muthulingam.

Hindi version

Singers: S. P. Balasubrahmanyam, Alka Yagnik, Anuradha Paudwal, Suresh WadkarLyrics: Indeevar

References

External links 
 

1991 multilingual films
1990s Tamil-language films
1991 action films
1991 films
Films directed by V. Ravichandran
Films scored by Hamsalekha
Indian action films
Indian multilingual films